Sjeng Schalken was the defending champion but did not compete that year.

Marc-Kevin Goellner won in the final 7–6(7–4), 7–6(7–2) against Àlex Corretja.

Seeds
A champion seed is indicated in bold text while text in italics indicates the round in which that seed was eliminated.

  Albert Costa (first round)
  Félix Mantilla (semifinals)
  Alberto Berasategui (second round)
  Àlex Corretja (final)
  Carlos Moyá (first round)
  Francisco Clavet (second round)
  Javier Sánchez (second round)
  Hernán Gumy (first round)

Draw

External links
 1996 Marbella Open draw

Singles